Pleezbaleevit!, frequently misspelled Pleezbalevit, is the only album by Doggy's Angels, released in 2000 on TVT Records. The album reached No. 138 on Billboard 200, No. 7 on Billboard's Top Independent Albums chart, No. 8 on the Heatseekers chart, and No. 35 on the Top R&B/Hip-Hop Albums chart.

The single "Baby If You're Ready" was a No. 1 hit on the Hot R&B/Hip-Hop Songs chart.

The release of the album led to a lawsuit by Columbia Pictures, claiming infringement of the Charlie's Angels franchise. The label responded by withdrawing the cover image and promotional artwork and renaming the band "Tha Angels", but in spite its efforts the group disbanded in 2002 with no further releases.

Track listing

Personnel 
Dave Aron – engineer
Marc Benesch – project coordinator
Darin Black – producer
Lupe Ceballos – management
Brian Gardner – mastering
Colin Jahn – art direction
Cynthia Levine – cover photo
Fredwreck Nassar – producer
Carol Sheridan – back cover
Meech Wells – producer
Benjamin Wheelock – art supervisor

References

Doggy's Angels albums
2000 debut albums
Albums produced by Battlecat (producer)
Albums produced by Fredwreck
Albums produced by JellyRoll
Snoop Dogg albums
Gangsta rap albums by American artists
G-funk albums